Papyrus 92 (in the Gregory-Aland numbering), designated by 𝔓92, (PNarmuthis 69.39a/229a) is an early New Testament papyrus.

Description 

The writing is in 27 lines per page.

The Greek text of this codex is a representative of the Alexandrian text-type. 𝔓92 shows strong affinity with 𝔓46, Codex Sinaiticus, and Vaticanus.

It is currently housed at the Egyptian Museum (Inv. 69,39a + 69,229a) in Cairo.

See also 
 2 Thessalonians 1
 Ephesians 1
 List of New Testament papyri
 Oxyrhynchus Papyri

References

Further reading 
 Claudio Gallazzi, Frammenti di un codice con le Epistole de Paolo, Zeitschrift für Papyrologie und Epigraphik 46 (Bonn: 1982), pp. 117–122.

External links 
 GA Papyrus 92. Center for the Study of New Testament Manuscripts

New Testament papyri
3rd-century biblical manuscripts
Early Greek manuscripts of the New Testament
Egyptian Museum
Epistle to the Ephesians papyri
Second Epistle to the Thessalonians papyri